Sunset is a town in St. Landry Parish, Louisiana, United States. The population was 2,897 at the 2010 census, up from 2,352 in 2000. It is part of the Opelousas–Eunice Micropolitan Statistical Area.

Geography
Sunset is located at  (30.408456, -92.066132).

According to the United States Census Bureau, the town has a total area of 3.1 square miles (8.1 km), of which 3.1 square miles (8.1 km) is land and 0.04 square mile (0.1 km) (0.96%) is water.

Demographics

2020 census

As of the 2020 United States census, there were 2,909 people, 1,063 households, and 796 families residing in the town.

2010 census
As of the census of 2010, there were 2,897 people, 1,129 households, and 787 families residing in the town. The racial makeup of the town was 46.8% White, 48.9% African American, 0.5% Native American, 0.1% Asian, 0.1% from other races, and 0.9% from two or more races. Hispanic or Latino of any race were 2.7% of the population.

There were 1,129 households, out of which 38.0% had children under the age of 18 living with them, 41.4% were married couples living together, 23.6% had a female householder with no husband present, and 30.3% were non-families. 25.8% of all households were made up of individuals, and 19.0% had someone living alone who was 65 years of age or older. The average household size was 2.57 and the average family size was 3.09.

In the town, the population was spread out, with 31.4% under the age of 18, 6.4% from 20 to 24, 25.1% from 25 to 44, 27.8% from 45 to 64, and 9.4% who were 65 years of age or older. The median age was 34.7 years. For every 100 females, there were 87.3 males. For every 100 females age 18 and over, there were 86.2 males.

As of the 2009 American Community Survey, the median income for a household in the town was $33,000, and the median income for a family was $62,708. Males had a median income of $59,375 versus $23,258 for females. The per capita income for the town was $20,901. About 10.6% of families and 18.3% of the population were below the poverty line, including 13.9% of those under age 18 and 39.4% of those age 65 or over.

History
Like many towns in Southern Louisiana, Sunset began as a railroad town (for the out-distribution of cotton and sweet potatoes and the in-distribution of specialty goods), was incorporated in 1904, and had its first village meeting that December 7. Victor Hugo Sibille was the first mayor. As part of a large-scale conversion of arable land away from cotton (due to the mass-destruction from the cotton boll weevil) and toward sweet potatoes in the late 19th century, the city gave itself the nickname "Sweet Potato Capital of the Nation" at the turn of the 20th century. According to local lore, The Bank of Sunset was one of the very few that did not close throughout the Great Depression of 1929.

References

External links

Towns in Louisiana
Towns in St. Landry Parish, Louisiana